Robert Francis Jenner (13 January 1802 – 8 April 1860) of Wenvoe Castle was High Sheriff of Glamorgan in 1828.

Family

The name "Jenner" is said to be the same as Genor or Genore. 
The Jenners of Wenvoe traced their ancestry back to Thomas Jenner of Northam, Sussex, who died about 1640.
His grandson was Sir Thomas Jenner of Petersham, Surrey (1638–1707), a barrister and member of parliament for Rye in 1685.
Thomas Jenner's grandson was Charles Jenner (1707–1770), Archdeacon of Huntingdon, Rector of Buckworth and Chaplain in Ordinary to King George II of Great Britain.
Charles Jenner's son, the grandfather of Robert Francis Jenner, was Robert Jenner of Chislehurst, Kent (1743–1810) who married Ann Birt, daughter and co-heiress of Peter Birt of Airmyn, Yorkshire.

Life

Robert Francis Jenner was born on 13 January 1802.
He was the eldest son of Robert Jenner (1776–1824) of Wenvoe Castle, Glamorgan.
His mother was Frances, eldest daughter of Major-General Francis Lascelles.
Jenner attended Eton College and then Brasenose College, Oxford, graduating on 28 January 1820 at the age of 18.
On 10 August 1824 Jenner married Elizabeth Lascelles (died 29 September 1850), eldest daughter of Sir Herbert Jenner-Fust, Dean of Arches.
She was his double first cousin.
They had ten sons and five daughters.
One of the daughters, Emma, wrote of her mother: "She always thought the year wasted if there was not a new baby born."
Jenner resided in Wenvoe Castle, and was a Justice of the Peace and Deputy Lieutenant for Glamorgan.
In 1828 he was appointed High Sheriff of Glamorgan.
Jenner was patron of St Mary's Church in the village of Jenner.
Robert Francis Jenner died on 8 April 1860.

Robert Francis Lascelles Jenner (1826–83), his eldest son, was Chairman of the Barry Railway Company, incorporated on 5 July 1865 to build a  mixed-gauge line to Barry from Peterston on the South Wales Railway. The project failed to get off the ground due to lack of funding.

Notes

Sources

1802 births
1860 deaths
High Sheriffs of Glamorgan
19th-century Welsh people
Jenner family (Wales)
Deputy Lieutenants of Glamorgan